Charles Eberle is an American politician from Idaho. Eberle is a former Republican member of Idaho House of Representatives.

Early life 
On February 2, 1942, Eberle was born in Akron, Ohio.

Education 
Eberle earned a Bachelor of Science degree from University of California, Santa Barbara. Eberle earned a Master of Science degree from University of Southern California.

Career 
In 1964, Eberle served in the United States Navy, until 1967.

On November 5, 2002, Eberle won the election and became a Republican member of Idaho House of Representatives for District 5, seat B. Enerle defeated Lyndon Harriman and Don Pischner with 53.7% of the votes.

Personal life 
Eberle's wife is Connie Eberle. Eberle AZ and his family live in Post Falls, Idaho.

References

External links 
 Charles Eberle at ruralnorthwest.com

Living people
Republican Party members of the Idaho House of Representatives
People from Akron, Ohio
People from Post Falls, Idaho
1942 births